Koyraboro Senni (Koroboro Senni, Koyra Senni or Gao Senni) is a member of the Songhay languages of Mali and is spoken by some 400,000 people along the Niger River from the town of Gourma-Rharous, east of Timbuktu, through Bourem, Gao and Ansongo to the Mali–Niger border.

The expression "koyra-boro senn-i" denotes "the language of the town dwellers", as opposed to nomads like the Tuareg people and other transhumant people.

Although Koyraboro Senni is associated with settled towns, it is a cosmopolitan language which has spread east and west of Gao, to the Fula people living at the Mali–Niger border and to the Bozo people of the Niger River. East of Timbuktu, Koyra Senni gives way relatively abruptly to the closely related Koyra Chiini.

Geographic distribution
The majority of speakers live in the Gao Region of Mali. It is also spoken in other parts of Mali and in other countries.

Phonology

Consonants

Vowels 

Nasalized realizations of vowel sounds may also occur, but they are rare among different dialects.

References
 Jeffrey Heath: Grammar of Koyraboro (Koroboro) Senni, the Songhay of Gao. Rüdiger Köppe Verlag, Köln 1999.

External links

 Open Language Archives Community
 Songhay Language Description

Songhay languages
Languages of Mali